The 2019 Africa Basketball League Final was the 33rd final of the FIBA Africa Basketball League, and the first under the new name. The game was played at 26 May 2019 at the Kilamba Arena in the Angolan capital of Luanda. It was also the last final of FIBA Africa's premier competition, before it was replaced by the Basketball Africa League.

Approximately 5,500 fans attended the game. Primeiro de Agosto won its record ninth African title. Primeiro's Eduardo Mingas was named MVP after the game.

Venue
The Kilamba Arena in Luanda featured as the arena for the Final Four.

Road to the finals

Game

References

2019, Final
2019 in Angolan sport
2019 in African basketball
2018–19 in basketball leagues